Royal Court may refer to:

Court of justice
Royal Courts of Justice,  England and Wales
The Royal Court, one of the courts of Jersey
The Royal Court of Guernsey, the court of justice of Guernsey

Royalty
Court (royal), the household and entourage of a monarch or other ruler, the princely court 
Royal Court, the name of the Royal Palace in the Oman city of Seeb

Other uses
Royal Court Theatre, in London, England
Royal Court Theatre, Liverpool, a theatre in Liverpool, England
The Royal Court, Timbaland's production company

See also
Court (disambiguation)
Curia regis
Royal (disambiguation)